Bahah cabinet was a Yemeni government led by Yemeni prime minister Khaled Bahah from 7 November 2014 to 22 January 2015. The cabinet was made up 36 ministers.

List of ministers

See also 
 Politics of Yemen

References 

2014 establishments in Yemen
Cabinets of Yemen
Government of Yemen

Bahah Cabinet